Glenn Kwidama (born 31 July 1962) is a former Netherlands Antilles international footballer who played as a midfielder.

Career statistics

Club

Notes

References

1962 births
Living people
Dutch Antillean footballers
Netherlands Antilles international footballers
Dutch Antillean expatriate footballers
Association football midfielders
Eredivisie players
Feyenoord players
Expatriate footballers in the Netherlands
RKV FC Sithoc players